Source Serif  (known as Source Serif Pro before 2021) is a serif typeface created by Frank Grießhammer for Adobe Systems. It is the third open-source font family from Adobe, distributed under the SIL Open Font License.

The typeface is inspired by the forms of Pierre Simon Fournier and is a complementary design to the Source Sans family. It is available in six weights in upright styles and italics, and five optical sizes. It is also available as a variable font with continuous weights from 200 to 900.

The first version, named "Source Serif Pro", was released in 2014. Version 2.0 was released in 2017 and introduced support for more Latin characters, Cyrillic, and Greek. In 2018, Latin italics were added in version "2.007R-ro/1.007R-it". In 2019, Greek and Cyrillic italic were added in version "3.000R". In 2021, a new release added optical sizes; the name "Pro" was dropped at this point.

See also
 Adobe Originals

Adobe's open-source family
 Source Sans Pro, the first member of Adobe's open-source family.
 Source Code Pro, the second member of Adobe's open-source family.
 Source Han Sans, the fourth member of Adobe's open-source family and the first to include CJK characters.
 Source Han Serif, the last member of Adobe's open-source family and includes CJK characters.

References

External links

 Source Serif on Typekit
 Source Serif specimen on GitHub
 GitHub project page

Transitional serif typefaces
Adobe typefaces
Free software Unicode typefaces
Typefaces with text figures
Computer-related introductions in 2014